The following table shows the world record progression in the men's 200 metres, as ratified by the IAAF. The current record of 19.19 seconds was set by Usain Bolt at the 2009 World Championships in Athletics.

The IAAF maintained separate records for 200 m over a straight track and over a curved track until 1976, when records for the former were discarded. The IAAF ratified the first record for 200 m on a curved track in 1951. "y" denotes times for 220 yards (201.17 m) which were also ratified for the event.

As of 2018, the IAAF has ratified 24 world records in the event.

Records 1951–1976

The "Time" column indicates the ratified mark; the "Wind" column indicates the wind assistance in metres per second, 2.0 m/s the current maximum allowable, a negative indicates the mark was set running into a wind; the "Auto" column indicates a fully automatic time that was also recorded in the event when hand-timed marks were used for official records, or which was the basis for the official mark, rounded to the 10th or 100th of a second, depending on the rules then in place. 

John Carlos ran 19.7A seconds (19.92A auto) (1.9 ms wind), at altitude, at the 1968 US Olympic Trials in Echo Summit.  The run was not ratified as a world record because Carlos was wearing shoes with 'brush' spikes which did not have sanction as official footwear.

Henry Carr's winning time at the 1964 Olympics (17 October) was a hand timed 20.3 seconds.  The electronic time was 20.36 seconds, which was the fastest auto time to that date. Tommie Smith ran 20.26 for 220 yards at Provo in 1967. By deducting .12 seconds for the 200 metre equivalent, he is estimated to have run 20.14 for that distance.

Records post-1977

Beginning in 1975, the IAAF accepted separate automatically electronically timed records for events up to 400 metres. Starting on January 1, 1977, the IAAF required fully automatic timing to the hundredth of a second for these events. 

Tommie Smith's 1968 Olympic gold medal victory was the fastest recorded fully electronic 200 metre sprint up to that time.  

The record progressions for automatic times at low altitude (after Carr's 20.36 in 1964) were 20.30 seconds by Valeriy Borzov at Helsinki in 1971, then Larry Black 20.28, 1972 at Munich, 20.00 (Borzov, 1972 also at Munich), 19.96 (Mennea, 1980), 19.75 (Carl Lewis, 1983), 19.75 (Joe DeLoach, 1988) and 19.73 (Michael Marsh, 1992), before Michael Johnson ran 19.66 in 1996.

See also
Women's 200 metres world record progression
Men's 100 metres world record progression

Notes

200
200 metres